Thomas Albert Curry (1900–1976), was a 20th century American pulp fiction writer who began writing crime and detective stories but went on to become one of the more prolific western writers in the genre.

Early life
Curry was born in Hartford, Connecticut, on November 4, 1900. He attended Columbia College in 1920 and graduated in 1922. In 1923, he worked as a crime reporter for William Randolph Hearst's newspaper the New York American. Some of his early crime stories were taken from this experience.

Curry's sister was actress Helen Curry who was married to fellow pulp fiction author F.R. Buckley.

Writing career
Curry was paid $25.00 for his first story to be published, "Diamond in the Rough", which appeared in the March 1921 edition of pulp magazine People's Favorite

Curry's stories have appeared in over 400 pulp magazines including Argosy, Black Mask, The Blue Book Magazine, Short Stories and several Thrilling Publications including Texas Rangers, Thrilling Adventures, Thrilling Ranch Stories and Thrilling Western

The Rio Kid
In 1939 Curry created his most well known character, The Rio Kid, bringing an element of historical fiction to the genre with his lead character interacting with actual historical events and people.  This series had its own magazine devoted to it from 1939 through 1953

As was not uncommon in the genre, in addition to writing under his own name Curry would also write under pseudonyms including Jackson Cole, Bradford Scott (house names for Texas Ranger Magazine) and John Benton (house name for Thrilling Publications and sometimes ghostwrite for others such as Romer Zane Grey, eldest son of Zane Grey.

Curry was a prominent member of Western Writers of America for 50 years.

Selected works

State register
Curry's former home in Norwalk, CT is listed on the Connecticut State Register of Historic Places.

References

External links
 Tom Curry, Guiana Trap Dime Adventure Magazine, October 1939

1900 births
1976 deaths
20th-century American writers
20th-century American male writers
American crime fiction writers
American detective fiction writers
American fiction writers
American short story writers
Pulp fiction writers
Western (genre) writers
Writers from Hartford, Connecticut
Writers of historical fiction set in the modern age
Writers from Norwalk, Connecticut
Columbia College (New York) alumni